The 1928 St. Louis Cardinals season was the team's 47th season in St. Louis, Missouri and the 37th season in the National League. The Cardinals went 95–59 during the season and finished first in the National League. In the World Series, they were swept by the New York Yankees.

Offseason
 December 14, 1927: Frank Gibson was purchased by the Cardinals from the Boston Braves.

Regular season
First baseman Jim Bottomley won the MVP Award this year, batting .325, with 31 home runs and 136 RBIs.

Season standings

Record vs. opponents

Roster

Player stats

Batting

Starters by position
Note: Pos = Position; G = Games played; AB = At bats; H = Hits; Avg. = Batting average; HR = Home runs; RBI = Runs batted in

Other batters
Note: G = Games played; AB = At bats; H = Hits; Avg. = Batting average; HR = Home runs; RBI = Runs batted in

Pitching

Starting pitchers
Note: G = Games pitched; IP = Innings pitched; W = Wins; L = Losses; ERA = Earned run average; SO = Strikeouts

Other pitchers
Note: G = Games pitched; IP = Innings pitched; W = Wins; L = Losses; ERA = Earned run average; SO = Strikeouts

Relief pitchers
Note: G = Games pitched; W = Wins; L = Losses; SV = Saves; ERA = Earned run average; SO = Strikeouts

1928 World Series

Farm system

LEAGUE CHAMPIONS: Rochester, Houston

References

External links
1928 St. Louis Cardinals at Baseball Reference
1928 St. Louis Cardinals team page at www.baseball-almanac.com

St. Louis Cardinals seasons
Saint Louis Cardinals season
National League champion seasons
St Louis